Lleras may refer to:

Alberto Lleras Camargo (1906–1990), important Colombian diplomat and political figure
Carlos Lleras Restrepo (1908–1994), important Colombian lawyer and political figure
Germán Vargas Lleras (born 1962), Colombian politician and lawyer
Puerto Lleras, town and municipality in the Meta Department, Colombia